Yes for Europe is the Brussels-based European Confederation of Young Entrepreneurs founded in 1988 to represent young entrepreneurs in Europe. The Confederation has one member per European Country, which is a representative national association of entrepreneurs below the age of 40.

Yes for Europe was launched in 1988 by seven national groups of young entrepreneurs in order to face the challenges resulting from the ratification of the Single European Act in July 1987. Young entrepreneurs from Austria, France, Germany, Greece, Italy, Portugal as well as from Japan and met in Capri, Italy, during the National Convention of Confindustria Giovani Imprenditori to sign the “International Young Entrepreneurs Charter”, the so-called “Capri Charter” which established the fundamental principles for the future cooperation.

Yes for Europe represents the European Union to a number of international young entrepreneurs organizations including the G20 Young Entrepreneurs Alliance and the Allied for Startups advocacy group.

Presidents of YES for Europe
1993/1995 Veit Schmid Schmidsfelden Austria 
1995/1997 Didier Livio France 
1997/1999 Emma Marcegaglia Italy 
1999/2001 Wolfgang Mainz Germany 
2001/2004 Tjark de Lange Netherlands
2004/2007 Murat Sarayli Turkey
2008/2009 Marting Ohneber Austria
2010 Ivan Sempere Massa Spain
2011/2015 Dimitris Tsingos Greece
2016 Luca Donelli Italy
2017 Przemysław Grzywa  Poland
2018 Mikel Beroiz Rosino Spain
2019 Benjamin Knöfler Germany
2020 Gürkan Yıldırım Turkey
2021 Jose Antonio Campos e Matos Portugal
2022 Matteo Dell'Acqua Italy

External links 
European Confederation of Young Entrepreneurs (YES for Europe)
G20 Young Entrepreneurs' Alliance
Allied for Startups

Youth organisations based in Belgium
Organizations established in 1988